Shorty, born Dalibor Bartulović, is a Croatian rapper from Vinkovci. He released his debut album in 2004 under the name 1,68 and became famous with his two records "Zeka" and "Dođi u Vinkovce".

Biography

Early life
Born and raised in Vinkovci, (Croatia, Europe) and interested in hip hop from a young age. He started to write rap lyrics in 1998. In 1999, he started to freestyle on the local radio station VFM on a show called Black Thing. A year later (2000) he was a co-former of a hip-hop group called B2. They made the greatest hip-hop demo group hit record produced by Shot (of Elemental) with the featuring of SADE and Remi (of Elemental). He was a guest on the "8 Mile Freestyle Battle" live show held in Zagreb, in club Aquarius (in 2002). Shortly after, the group B2 fell apart and Shorty started his solo career and formed a new hip-hop group with Saba and DJ Makro Polo called Bon-Ton. At the end of 2003, he started to make records in MORRIS studio (owned by Miro Vidović) for his debut album.

Success
At Aquarius Records, Shorty released 1,68 in 2004 with his hit records "Zeka" (with guest-appearance of Duško Čurlić), "Dođi u Vinkovce" featured by Miroslav Štivić, "Apel za mir" featured by Edo Maajka and "Božićna" featured by Remi. After three years with no records, he released his second album called Moj jedini način. The entire second album is dedicated to Shorty's cousin Tomislav "Tomi" Bartulović who was born in 1980 and died in 2005. The last track on the album talks about Shorty's love and relationship with his cousin Tomi. In song, Shorty raps: "i na kraju jos bih ti htio reci hvala, moj braticu Tomi, bila te je cast poznavat'" ("and in the end I'd also like to say thank you, my cousin Tomi, it's been an honor to know you"). In 2007 he married Ana Ambrenac.

Discography

1,68
2004, Aquarius Records. Produced by DJ Makro Polo, Dražen Kvočić, and Tomo Žaper.

Moj jedini način
2007, Aquarius Records. Produced by Koolade, Dash, Baby Dooks, and Makro Polo

Veličina nije bitna
In 2009, Shorty released his third album Veličina nije bitna.

References

External links
www.aquarius-records.com

Croatian rappers
1980 births
Living people
People from Vinkovci